Lucy Aharish (born 18 September 1981) is an Arab-Israeli news anchor, reporter, television host and actress. She was the first Muslim Arab news presenter on mainstream Hebrew-language Israeli television.

As of 2018, Aharish serves as a news anchor at Reshet 13, and was previously a morning anchor on a current-affairs show on its predecessor Channel 2, a presenter of the Evening Edition at i24news, a news presenter and reporter at Channel 10, a co-host at Radio 99, a late-night co-host on Channel 1, as well as a co-host on KAN 11.

Early life and education
Aharish was born in Dimona, Israel, to an Arab-Muslim family. Her parents Maaruf and Salwa Aharish were originally from the city of Nazareth. She is the youngest of three daughters. Growing up, she was the only Arab student at her school. On Purim she dressed up as Queen Esther, and on Israeli Independence Day she wore blue and white. Later, in 2015, Aharish praised her former high school principal Meir Cohen (currently a Knesset member with the Yesh Atid party) for having fostered an uncompromising stance against racism.

In the summer of 1987, a few months before she turned six years old, she was slightly injured when a Molotov cocktail was thrown at her family's car by Palestinian militants, while driving in the Gaza Strip.

During her adolescence, she says she was able to relate to right-wing voters: "I am an Arab who grew up among Moroccan Jews [in Israel]. That's the worst. You learn the hard-core shticks; they have a very short fuse. I was a right-wing Muslim, a fan of Beitar (Jerusalem soccer club with nationalistic fans)." In 2009, she identified with the left.

While at university, she drifted toward becoming a devout Muslim, although subsequently distanced herself from the religious life. The idea of pursuing a career in media developed after she moved to Jerusalem to study social sciences and theater at Hebrew University. "[O]n Highway 1 I saw Arabs being taken out of a van and made to face a wall, with rifles aimed at them. I felt that no human being deserves that, and then the penny dropped. But it's also impossible to ignore what the Palestinians are doing." After graduating from Hebrew University, she studied journalism at the Koteret school in Tel Aviv and then interned for a year and a half at a school in Germany.

Career
Upon returning from Germany, Aharish moved to Tel Aviv. Following a two-week stint as an Arab affairs reporter for Yedioth Ahronoth, in 2007, she became the first Arab to present the news on mainstream Israeli television when she was hired by Channel 10. After leaving that job in 2008, owing to professional differences, she went on to report for Channel 10's Erev Tov ("Good Evening") with Guy Pines and to co-host a morning radio show with Emmanuel Rosen and Maya Bengal.

In 2011, she co-hosted Channel One's late-night show, Nivheret ha-Halomot ("The Dream Team"), as well as Hamahadura ("The Edition"), a current events program for teens.

Aharish's time as anchor at i24news was one of some volatility. During Operation Protective Edge, she conducted an on-air interview with a Hamas official in Gaza, where she accused Hamas of using civilians as human shields and called on Gazan residents to rebel against the Hamas regime. During this same period, the station's CEO Frank Melloul was filmed taking the Ice Bucket Challenge, the timing of which was lambasted in the French press. Aharish interviewed late Israeli President Shimon Peres in the Jaffa studios of i24news. Weekly press review segments were provided by media correspondent Anthony Grant, a former blogger for The New York Times.

In April 2015, Aharish was one of twelve Israeli personalities chosen to light torches in the official ceremony kicking off Israel's 67th Independence Day celebrations.

In March 2020, Aharish started to co-host the daily edition of the television program "Culture Agent" along with Kobi Meidan on KAN 11. She was dismissed from KAN three days later because of a staff restructuring related to the COVID-19 pandemic, according to the Corporation. Some suggest she was fired for participating in a rally against Benjamin Netanyahu's handling of the pandemic. The same year, she participated in the Israeli production of The Masked Singer as The Stork.

Personal life
She married Jewish-Israeli actor Tsahi HaLevi in a private ceremony on October 10, 2018, after four years of a relationship that was kept in secret until then for fear of harassment. Their marriage led to a public controversy, with Oren Hazan criticizing it as "assimilation", and many Knesset members, including other government officials, congratulating the couple and writing their colleagues off as "racist".

See also
Media of Israel
Women in journalism and media professions
Rana Raslan
Lucy Ayoub
Mira Awad
Huda Naccache

References

External links

1981 births
Arab citizens of Israel
Hebrew University of Jerusalem alumni
Israeli television journalists
Israeli Arab journalists
Israeli television presenters
Israeli women journalists
Living people
People from Dimona
Israeli Muslims
Israeli women television presenters